Cabot Strait is a strait in eastern Canada approximately 110 kilometres wide between Cape Ray, Newfoundland and Cape North, Cape Breton Island. It is the widest of the three outlets for the Gulf of Saint Lawrence into the Atlantic Ocean, the others being the Strait of Belle Isle and Strait of Canso.  It is named for the italian explorer Giovanni Caboto.

The strait's bathymetry is varied, with the Laurentian Channel creating a deep trench through its centre, and comparatively shallow coastal waters closer to Newfoundland and Cape Breton Island.  These bathymetric conditions have been known by mariners to cause rogue waves.  The steep slope of the Laurentian Channel was the site of a disastrous submarine landslide at the southeastern end of the strait, triggered by the 1929 Grand Banks earthquake and leading to a tsunami that devastated communities along Newfoundland's south coast and parts of Cape Breton Island.

A strategically important waterway throughout Canadian and Newfoundland history, the strait is also an important international shipping route, being the primary waterway linking the Atlantic with inland ports on the Great Lakes and St. Lawrence Seaway.

The strait is crossed daily by the Marine Atlantic ferry service linking Channel-Port aux Basques, and North Sydney.  Ferries have been operating across the strait since 1898 and a submarine telegraph cable was laid in 1856 as part of the transatlantic telegraph cable project.

An infamous location in the strait for shipwrecks during the age of sail, St. Paul's Island, came to be referred to as the "Graveyard of the Gulf" (of St. Lawrence).

In October 1942, German U-boat U-69 torpedoed and sank the unlit Newfoundland ferry , killing 137 people.  Then on 25 November 1944 HMCS Shawinigan was torpedoed and sunk with all hands on board (91 crew) by U-1228.

In 1998, the Cypriot bulk carrier the MV flare split in half in the Cabot Strait while sailing from Rotterdam to Quebec with the loss of 21 lives on board.

References 

Notes
Nautical chart #4022 - Cabot Strait and approaches / Détroit de Cabot et les approches), published by Canadian Hydrographic Service, 17 January 2003

Straits of Newfoundland and Labrador
Straits of Nova Scotia
Straits of the Atlantic Ocean
Borders of Newfoundland and Labrador
Borders of Nova Scotia
Canada–Saint Pierre and Miquelon border